Walberswick railway station was located in Walberswick, Suffolk, England. It closed in 1929, 50 years after it had opened for passenger traffic.

References

Disused railway stations in Suffolk
Former Southwold Railway stations
Railway stations in Great Britain opened in 1879
Railway stations in Great Britain closed in 1929
Walberswick